Frans Heikkinen (22 April 1906 – 8 October 1943) was a Finnish cross-country skier. He competed in the 1936 Winter Olympics and finished seventh in the 50 km event.

Heikkinen was born to a farmer and had a sister Eeva and three brothers, Lauri, Jaakko and Esko; all siblings were accomplished cross-country skiers. He worked as a teacher in Sotkamo, where in the early 1930s he married a fellow teacher Hilppa Liisa Iivonen. He died from a brain hemorrhage during the Continuation War, aged 37.

Cross-country skiing results

World Championships

References

1906 births
1943 deaths
People from Paltamo
People from Oulu Province (Grand Duchy of Finland)
Finnish male cross-country skiers
Olympic cross-country skiers of Finland
Cross-country skiers at the 1936 Winter Olympics
Sportspeople from Kainuu
20th-century Finnish people